Leaving the 20th Century is a recording of the Manic Millennium concert by the Welsh rock band Manic Street Preachers, released 2000. The concert, which celebrated the 10th anniversary of the band, was performed on New Year's Eve 1999–2000 at the Millennium Stadium in Cardiff, in front of more than 57,000 fans. The event became international as the final song of the event was broadcast live all over the world through satellites.

The concert was released on VHS and DVD. It includes interview clips in which the band discuss their history and the songs, and an extra feature performance of "Ready for Drowning" and "If You Tolerate This Your Children Will Be Next", recorded at Château de la Motte, France, in 1998.

Track listing
Introduction
"You Stole the Sun from My Heart"
"Faster"
"Everything Must Go"
"Tsunami"
"The Masses Against the Classes"
"The Everlasting"
"Kevin Carter"
"La Tristesse Durera (Scream to a Sigh)"
"Rock and Roll Music"
"Ready for Drowning"
"Of Walking Abortion"
"No Surface All Feeling"
"Motown Junk"
"Motorcycle Emptiness"
"Can't Take My Eyes Off You"
"Small Black Flowers that Grow in the Sky"
"Australia"
"Elvis Impersonator: Blackpool Pier"
"You Love Us"
"Stay Beautiful"
"If You Tolerate This Your Children Will Be Next"
"A Design for Life"
Closing credits

References

Manic Street Preachers video albums
Manic Street Preachers live albums